Jheronimus Bosch—Visions of Genius was a 2016 art exhibition (13 February until 8 May 2016) at the Noordbrabants Museum in 's-Hertogenbosch, the Netherlands, about the work of Hieronymus Bosch, a native of 's-Hertogenbosch.

Seventeen of the world's known Bosch paintings were on display in the exhibition, along with 19 drawings. The Telegraph described the work of curator Charles de Mooij in gathering them as "a feat of stamina and silver-tongued curatorial cunning."

The exhibition presented Bosch as "a great realist" highlighting the realistically-painted detail in his surreal paintings, backdating the Renaissance in the process since Bosch painted half a century before Vasari published.

The years of intensive research by the Bosch Research and Conservation Project that preceded the exhibition, led scholars to demote two paintings belonging to the Prado, The Cure of Folly and The Temptation of St. Anthony.  Long thought to be by Bosch, they are now regarded as having been painted by followers or by artists in Bosch's workshop.

However, as a result of the research, the small Temptation of St. Anthony belonging to the Nelson-Atkins Museum of Art in Kansas City, Missouri, long thought to have been painted by a follower, is now regarded as the work of Bosch's own hand.

A documentary film based on constructing this show was made in 2016. It is titled Hieronymus Bosch, Touched by the Devil.

Paintings
The following paintings by Hieronymus Bosch were on display:

References

External links
Jhieronymus Bosch - Visions of genius
The Jheronimus Bosch Exhibition

Art exhibitions in the Netherlands
2016 in art
Hieronymus Bosch